In economics, fungibility  is the property of a good or a commodity whose individual units are essentially interchangeable, and each of whose parts is indistinguishable from any other part. Fungible tokens can be exchanged or replaced; for example, a $100 note can easily be exchanged for twenty $5 bills. In contrast, non-fungible tokens cannot be exchanged in the same manner. 

For example, gold is fungible because its value doesn’t depend on any specific form, whether of coins, ingots, or other states. However, a unique item such as a gold statue by a famous artist would not be considered fungible. In short, a thing is fungible when all equivalent amounts of that thing are interchangeable. Fungible  commodities include sweet crude oil, company shares, bonds, other precious metals, and currencies.

Fungibility refers only to the equivalence and indistinguishability of each unit of a commodity with other units of the same commodity, and not to the exchange of one commodity for another.

Etymology
The word fungibility comes from the Latin fungibilis, from the verb fungī, meaning "to perform", via phrases such as fungi vice, meaning "serve in place of". It is related to words such as "function" and "defunct".

Use

Finance
Fungibility is different from liquidity. A good is said to be liquid if it can be easily exchanged for money or another good. A good is fungible if one unit of the good is substantially equivalent to another unit of the same good of the same quality at the same time, place, etc.

Notably, money is fungible: one US $10 banknote is interchangeable with any other genuine banknote like it.  It is also interchangeable with two fives, ten ones, or any other combination of banknotes and coins adding up to $10.

On the other hand, diamonds and other gems are not perfectly fungible because their varying cuts, colors, grades, and sizes make it difficult to find several diamonds expected to have the same value. Packaged products on a retail shelf may be considered fungible if they are of the same type and equivalent in function and form. Customers and clerks can interchange packages freely until purchase, and sometimes afterward. After one opens the package and uses the product, however, it is usually considered unique and no longer interchangeable with unopened packages outside of exceptional circumstances, such as a return or exchange.

Cryptocurrency 
Cryptocurrencies are usually considered to be fungible assets, where one coin is equivalent to another. However, after a major breach in Japanese exchange Coincheck, token developers for cryptocurrency NEM added a special flag to hacked coins to indicate they are not to be traded or used.

Non-fungible tokens are similar to units of blockchain currency, except that they are connected to unique digital files, so that individual tokens can be considered to have a meaningful distinction from others.

Tasking
Fungibility has been used to describe certain types of tasks that can be broken down into interchangeable pieces that are easily parallelized and are not interdependent on the other pieces. For example: If a worker can hand dig one meter of ditch in a day, and a ten-meter ditch needs to be dug, that worker can either be given ten days to complete the entire project, or nine more workers can be hired for a single day. Each worker can complete their piece of the project without interfering with the other workers, and more importantly, each worker is not dependent on the results of any of the other workers to complete their share of the total project.

On the other hand, non-fungible tasks tend to be highly serial in nature and require the completion of earlier steps before later steps can even be started. As an example of a serial task that is not fungible, suppose there was a group of nine newly pregnant women. After one month, these women would have experienced a total of nine months of pregnancy, but a complete baby would not have been formed.

Quantum physics
Oxford University theoretical physicist David Deutsch has adopted the term "fungible" to describe the physical nature of quantum particles and universes within the quantum multiverse, where, by virtue of being identical in all respects, different particles chaotically divide or combine as a result of physical interactions from a common fungible fund in superposition.

Law

United States

In legal disputes in the United States, when one party is compelled to remedy another party as the result of a ruling or adjudication, the appropriate legal remedy may depend on the fungibility of the underlying right, obligation or property interest that is intended to be restored. Depending on whether the interests of the aggrieved party are fungible, a determination made by the trier of fact, the appropriate remedy may change. For example, a court may require specific performance (an equitable remedy) as a remedy for breach of contract, instead of the more favored remedy of monetary damages.

Belgium
Belgium has adopted fungibility for its domestic central securities depository, CIK (Euroclear), which was set up in 1967–1968. According to royal decree No. 62, issued on 10 November 1967, depositors of fungible securities have the rights of co-ownership. This change was fundamental to the development of Euroclear, by then beginning to process Eurobonds and build systems.

See also
Currency
Substitute good, re currency a currency substitution might be dollarization.
Interchangeable parts

References

Further reading
 

Commodities